Joselo Soriano Díaz (born April 13, 1980) is a Dominican former Major League Baseball pitcher. He has played in MLB for the Kansas City Royals and Texas Rangers and in Nippon Professional Baseball for the Yokohama BayStars.

Career
At the age of 16, Díaz was signed by the Los Angeles Dodgers as a non-drafted free agent. Seven years later, on July 14, he found himself traded by Los Angeles to the New York Mets organization. He was subsequently dealt, along with starting pitcher Scott Kazmir, to the Tampa Bay Devil Rays at the  non-waiver trading deadline.

Again, he did not break into the major leagues, and he became a free agent after season's end. He moved on to the Texas Rangers organization, signing with Texas in January .

Díaz received an opportunity when he was dealt to Kansas City in another deadline deal, this time on July 31, 2006, for outfielder-designated hitter Matt Stairs. Weeks later, he received a call-up with the Royals and made his major league debut on September 6 against the New York Yankees at Kauffman Stadium in Kansas City. In October, Díaz became a free agent.

After playing  for the Yokohama BayStars in Japan's Central League, Díaz signed a minor league deal with the Mets on January 7, . Díaz started the season with the New Orleans Zephyrs, then returned to the Rangers organization during the season. He was called up to the majors on July 11, and made his Rangers debut the following day in a game against the Chicago White Sox. He was designated for assignment on July 18, after just one appearance.

On March 10, 2011, he signed a contract with the Long Island Ducks.

References

External links

1980 births
Living people
Akron Aeros players
Azucareros del Este players
Buffalo Bisons (minor league) players
Dominican Republic expatriate baseball players in Japan
Dominican Republic expatriate baseball players in the United States
Frisco RoughRiders players
Jacksonville Suns players
Kansas City Royals players
Long Island Ducks players
Major League Baseball pitchers
Major League Baseball players from the Dominican Republic
New Orleans Zephyrs players
Nippon Professional Baseball pitchers
Oklahoma RedHawks players
People from San Pedro de Macorís Province
St. Lucie Mets players
Texas Rangers players
Vero Beach Dodgers players
Yokohama BayStars players
Binghamton Mets players
Caribes de Anzoátegui players
Great Falls Dodgers players
Montgomery Biscuits players
Omaha Royals players
Peoria Saguaros players
South Georgia Waves players
Sultanes de Monterrey players
Dominican Republic expatriate baseball players in Mexico
Toros del Este players
Wilmington Waves players
Dominican Republic expatriate baseball players in Venezuela